Raven is a British children's television drama series made for ITV by ATV in 1977. The series starred Phil Daniels in the title role.

Story
A orphan and former borstal inmate sent on a rehabilitation programme, assisting an archaeology professor in his excavation of a system of caves and who subsequently is compelled to fight a plan to build a nuclear waste disposal plant on the site. The man-made cave system is underneath an ancient stone circle, and contains 5th-century rock carvings which may be connected to the legend of King Arthur and Arthurian lore. 
The professor believes that "Arthur" may not have been a single individual but an inherited office and he emphasises the notion of Arthur and his knights slumbering below the West Country landscape awaiting the call to return to action in a time of peril, more as an idea than a physical reality. The programme consistently featured the sign of Pluto (referencing Plutonium as a by-product of a nuclear reactions), a symbol for Raven's quest.

The core of the story is the central sage/apprentice hero relationship between Professor Young and Raven, representing the legend of Merlin and King Arthur, both characters having avian projections: Young as a merlin (a bird which often accompanies Raven throughout the story), and Raven (protected by his namesake bird raven at birth when abandoned by his parents).

Produciton
Other cast members in the serial included Michael Aldridge, Patsy Rowlands, James Kerry, Shirley Cheriton and Tenniel Evans.

Release
An episode of this series is available to view at the National Media Museum in Bradford, UK.

The whole series of six parts was long been believed to be incomplete in the archives, until Network DVD, an independent DVD publishing company that specialises in classic British television, unearthed the original 2" VT tapes. Network released the series on DVD in 2010.

External links

References

Television series based on Arthurian legend
ITV children's television shows
British children's television series
1977 British television series debuts
1977 British television series endings
1970s British children's television series
English-language television shows
Television shows produced by Associated Television (ATV)